Jason Cleere (born 1 August 1996) is an Irish hurler who plays for Kilkenny Senior Championship club Bennettsbridge and at inter-county level with the Kilkenny senior hurling team. He usually lines out as a left wing-back.

Playing career

St. Kieran's College

Cleere first came to prominence as a hurler with St. Kieran's College in Kilkenny. Having played in every grade as a hurler, he was eventually called up the college's senior team. On 5 April 2014, he lined out at right wing-back when St. Kieran's College defeated Kilkenny CBS to win the Dr. Croke Cup.

On 28 February 2015, Cleere won a Leinster Championship medal when he lined out at centre-back when St. Kieran's College defeated St. Peter's College by 1-14 to 1-06 in the final. He was again at centre-back when St. Kieran's faced Thurles CBS in the All-Ireland final and collected a second successive winners' medal following a 1-15 to 1-12 victory.

Bennettsbridge

Cleere joined the Bennettsbridge club at a young age and played in all grades at juvenile and underage levels before eventually joining the club's top adult team.

On 9 November 2014, Cleere won a Kilkenny Junior Championship medal following a 1-17 to 1-07 defeat of Mooncoin in the final. On 6 December, he won a Leinster Championship medal following Bennettsbridge's 1-20 to 0-03 defeat of Shamrocks in the final. Bennettsbridge subsequently qualified for an All-Ireland final meeting with Fullen Gaels on 15 February 2015. Cleere collected a winners' medal from right wing-back following a 2-17 to 2-14 victory.

On 18 October 2015, Cleere was at right wing-back when Bennettsbridge drew 0-20 to 3-11 with St Patrick's Ballyragget in the final of the Kilkenny Intermediate Championship. He lined out in the same position in the replay on 24 October and collected a winners' medal after a 1-16 to 1-14 victory. Cleere won a Leinster Championship medal on 21 November following a 1-14 to 0-13 defeat of Kiltale in the final. On 7 February 2016, he was selected at right wing-back for the All-Ireland final against Abbeyknockmoy. He ended the game with a winners' medal following a 1-17 to 1-14 victory.

On 28 October 2018, Cleere lined out at centre-back when Bennettsbridge faced Ballyhale Shamrocks in the final of the Kilkenny Senior Championship. He ended up on the losing side following a 2-20 to 2-17 victory for Ballyhale.

Kilkenny

Minor and under-21

Cleere was selected for the Kilkenny minor team for the first time during the 2013 Leinster Championship. On 7 July he won a Leinster Championship medal as a non-playing substitute following Kilkenny's 1-18 to 0-08 defeat of Laois in the final.

On 26 April 2014, Cleere made his first appearance for the Kilkenny minor team when he lined out right wing-back in a 2-08 to 0-03 defeat by Dublin in the Leinster Championship. He was switched to centre-back for the Leinster final against Dublin on 6 July and collected a winners' medal following the 2-19 to 2-10 victory. On 7 September, Cleere won an All-Ireland medal at centre-back following Kilkenny's 2-17 to 0-19 defeat of Limerick in the final. It was his last game in the minor grade.

Cleere subsequently progressed onto the Kilkenny under-21 team during the 2015 Leinster Championship. He made his first appearance for the team on 2 June when he lined out at right wing-back in Kilkenny's 4-12 to 2-16 defeat of Dublin in the quarter-final. On 8 June, Cleere was again at right wing-back when Kilkenny suffered a 4-17 to 1-09 defeat by Wexford in the Leinster final.

On 5 July 2017, Cleere won a Leinster Championship medal with the under-21 team after scoring three points from centre-back in 0-30 to 1-15 defeat of Wexford in the final. On 9 September, he was again at centre-back for Kilkenny's 0-17 to 0-11 defeat by Limerick in the All-Ireland final.

Intermediate

Cleere earned a call up to the Kilkenny intermediate team for the 2016 Leinster Championship. He made his first appearance for the team on 13 July in Kilkenny's 3-14 to 2-14 defeat of Wexford in the Leinster final. On 6 August, Cleere was selected at right wing-back when Kilkenny faced Clare in the All-Ireland final. He ended the game with a winners' medal following a 5-16 to 1-16 victory.

Senior

Cleere was added to the Kilkenny senior team prior to the start of the 2017 National League. He made his first appearance on 5 March when he was selected at centre-back in Kilkenny's 0-22 to 0-15 defeat of Cork.

Career statistics

Honours

St. Kieran's College
All-Ireland Colleges Senior Hurling Championship (2): 2014, 2015
Leinster Colleges Senior Hurling Championship (1): 2015

Bennettsbridge
All-Ireland Intermediate Club Hurling Championship (1): 2016
Leinster Intermediate Club Hurling Championship (1): 2015
Kilkenny Intermediate Hurling Championship (1): 2015
All-Ireland Junior Club Hurling Championship (1): 2015
Leinster Junior Club Hurling Championship (1): 2014
Kilkenny Junior Hurling Championship (1): 2014

Kilkenny
All-Ireland Intermediate Hurling Championship (1): 2016
Leinster Intermediate Hurling Championship (1): 2016
Leinster Under-21 Hurling Championship (1): 2017
All-Ireland Minor Hurling Championship (1): 2014
Leinster Minor Hurling Championship (1): 2014

References

1996 births
Living people
Bennettsbridge hurlers
Kilkenny inter-county hurlers